After You... is a 2003 French film directed by Pierre Salvadori and stars Daniel Auteuil, José Garcia, and Sandrine Kiberlain. The film won an Etoile d'Or in the Best Actor category for Auteuil and also a nomination for a César Award for Best Actor.

Plot
Antoine (Daniel Auteuil), a head waiter, takes a shortcut through a park one night and spots a young man named Louis attempting to kill himself. He saves him but that henceforth the suicidal man clings to him and asks more and more of him.

Cast
Daniel Auteuil as Antoine Letoux
José Garcia as Louis
Sandrine Kiberlain as Blanche Grimaldi; Louis's ex-girlfriend
Marilyne Canto as Christine; Antoine's girlfriend
Michèle Moretti as Martine
Garance Clavel as Karine
Fabio Zenoni as André
Jocelyne Desverchère as Sandrine the florist
Didier Menin as the man at the Thai restaurant
Jean-Claude Lecas as the cook*Blandine Pélissier as the nurse
Jean-Charles Dumay as Serge the restaurateur
Ange Ruzé as the young waiter
Élise Otzenberger as the hairdresser
Jean-Luc Abel as the inspector

Awards and nominations
César Awards (France)
Nominated: Best Actor (Daniel Auteuil)

References

External links
 
 

2003 films
French romantic comedy films
Films directed by Pierre Salvadori
2000s French films